The curvaton is a hypothetical elementary particle which mediates a scalar field in early universe cosmology.   It can generate fluctuations during inflation, but does not itself drive inflation, instead it generates curvature perturbations at late times after the inflaton field has decayed and the decay products have redshifted away, when the curvaton is the dominant component of the energy density. It is used to generate a flat spectrum of CMB perturbations in models of inflation where the potential is otherwise too steep or in alternatives to inflation like the pre-Big Bang scenario.

The model was proposed by three groups shortly after one another in 2001: Kari Enqvist and Martin S. Sloth (Sep, 2001),   David Wands and David H. Lyth (Oct, 2001),  Takeo Moroi and Tomo Takahashi (Oct, 2001).

See also
 Metric expansion of space
 Hubble's law
 Big Bang
 Cosmological constant
 Inflaton
 Cosmological perturbation theory
 Structure formation
 Kari Enqvist
 David Wands
 David H. Lyth

Notes

Physical cosmology
Inflation (cosmology)
Hypothetical elementary particles